Mewar Residency was a political subdivision of Rajputana Agency in British India. After treaty relations between Mewar and the East India Company commenced in 1818, the British government created a political sub-division known as Mewar Agency with its headquarters in Nimuch. In 1860–61, the headquarters were moved to Udaipur and, in 1881–82, the designation was changed from 'Agency' to 'Residency.' As of 1908, the Mewar Residency consisted of the four states of Udaipur, Banswara, Dungarpur, and Partabgarh, with headquarters in Udaipur.

The Western Rajputana States Agency, which included the states of Banswara, Dungarpur and Partabgarh, was part of Mewar Residency until 1906, before it separated.

See also
 Mewar

References

 Gazetteers of Mewar Residency, Published by International Documentation Centre, 1906.
 Rajputana Gazetteers, Vol. II-A &  Vol. II-B : The Mewar Residency/text and statistical tables compiled by K.D. Erskine. First published in 1908. 1992.
 Later Mewar, by Ramavallabh Somani. Published by Shantidevi Somani, 1985.
 Mewar Residency, by Rajputana (Agency), R.D. Erskine. Published by Vintage Books, 1996. . Online at Digital Library of India

External links
 Mewar Encyclopedia

Mewar
Residencies of British India
Rajputana Agency